Big Bunny may refer to:

 A DC-9 jet owned by Playboy Enterprises from 1970 to 1976 
 A Flash cartoon series created by Amy Winfrey

Similar Names:
 Big Buck Bunny, a short computer-animated comedy film by the Blender Institute
 Big House Bunny, a 1948 Looney Tunes Bugs Bunny cartoon
 Big Top Bunny, a 1951 Looney Tunes Bugs Bunny cartoon